Punchline is a 1988 American comedy-drama film written and directed by David Seltzer and distributed by Columbia Pictures. Its story follows a talented young comic as he helps a housewife who wants to break into stand-up comedy. It stars Sally Field, Tom Hanks, John Goodman, and Mark Rydell.

The film was produced by Daniel Melnick and Michael I. Rachmil and was released on October 7, 1988. It grossed $21.0 million in the United States and Canada, against a budget of $15 million. It received generally mixed reviews and has a 60% approval rating based on 20 votes on Rotten Tomatoes.

Plot
Steven Gold is a struggling medical student who moonlights as a stand-up comedian. It quickly becomes evident that he is lousy at the former and excels at the latter. And yet, when he is given a chance at the big time, he cracks under the pressure. Lilah is a dedicated housewife who yearns to be a comic. She has the raw talent but does not have the command of craft that Steven possesses.

At first, he doesn't give Lilah the time of day. Steven is derailed by the unexpected appearance of his father and brother, both medical professionals. Lilah's unfailing support wins Steven's affections and he teaches her the fundamentals of stand-up comedy. Lilah has spent her cookie jar money to buy jokes. Steven advises her to connect with the audience to unveil the honest humor in her life as a wife and mother. Lilah discovers her natural gift of making people laugh. An uneasy friendship develops between the two as they share the personal conflicts they must resolve: Steven's desire to make it big vs. his inability to do so and Lilah's love of comedy vs. her love for her family.

Steven, beginning to appear emotionally unstable, develops a romantic attraction to Lilah–to her dismay. Lilah struggles to remain loyal to her family and her friend, while maintaining her conviction and love of comedy. Steven mimes a painful rendition of Gene Kelly's famous dance routine from Singin' in the Rain.

The film culminates in a competition at the "Gas Station" comedy club where Steven, Lilah and other aspiring comedians have been performing. A judges panel of television executives promise the winner a prime time opportunity and possible stardom. As they compete on stage, the characters also grapple with conflicts among their desires for success on stage, their loyalties to one another, and the expectations of their families. Pending the judges' final tally, with a note of support from her husband in her hand, and hearing Steven has only two of the five judges' votes, Lilah withdraws "in case the winner is me" and persists in leaving when the club owner reveals she was in fact the winner. She leaves with her husband who, after watching his wife do stand-up for the first time, is won over and begins suggesting ideas for her next set. The pair walk away arm in arm reminiscing about the funny and endearing sayings of their children. Inside, Steven is declared the winner of the show, which reflects Lilah's judgment and that of their competing fellow comics.

Cast

 Sally Field as Lilah Krytsick
 Tom Hanks as Steven Gold
 John Goodman as John Krytsick
 Mark Rydell as Romeo
 Kim Greist as Madeline Urie
 Paul Mazursky as Arnold
 Taylor Negron as Albert Emperato
 Damon Wayans as Percy
 Candace Cameron as Carrie Krytsick
 Ángel Salazar as Rico

Production
David Seltzer wrote the first draft for Punchline in 1979 after becoming fascinated by comedy clubs while looking for someone to play a psychiatrist on a television pilot that he was writing. He had a development deal with the movie division of ABC. Originally, the tone of the film was more good-natured a la Fame (1980) with more characters and less of an emphasis on Steven Gold. Bob Bookman, an executive, sponsored the script but left for Columbia Pictures. He bought the screenplay because Howard Zieff was interested in directing it. When Zieff lost interest (he ended up doing Unfaithfully Yours in 1984), the script was buried for years.

In 1986, producer Daniel Melnick found the screenplay for Punchline among twelve other unrealized scripts in the vaults of Columbia Pictures. Seltzer's screenplay had gone through three changes of studio management because the executives didn't like the mix of comedy and drama as well as the Steven Gold character because they thought he was, according to Melnick, "obsessive, certainly self-destructive and could be considered mean-spirited." The studio couldn’t get a major star to commit to the material and so Melnick decided to make the movie for $8 million and with no stars. Interim studio president Steve Sohmer didn't like that idea and sent the script to Sally Field, who had a production deal with Columbia. Field agreed to star in and produce the movie. Once Field signed on, the budget was set at $15 million.

Field didn't mind sharing the majority of the screen time with Hanks and taking on the role of producer because, as she said in an interview at the time, "as a producer I am not developing films in which I can do fancy footwork. I don't have to have the tour de force part." New York comic Susie Essman and sitcom writer Dottie Archibald coached Field. The writer also served as comedy consultant for the movie, recruiting fifteen comics to populate the comedy club Steven and Lilah frequent. Field's research often mirrored her character's as she remembers working "for about six months to find where Lilah's comedy was, which is what my character was going through. So it was actually happening to both of us."

Two months before Punchline went into production, Tom Hanks wrote a five-minute stand-up act and performed it at the Comedy Store in Los Angeles. As Hanks recalls, "it was pure flop sweat time, an embarrassment. That material lasted 1 minute 40 seconds, and it had no theme." Hanks tried again and again, sometimes hitting three clubs a night. It took a month before the actor "didn't sweat like a pig" on stage. By that point he had enlisted an old friend and comedy writer Randy Fechter and stand-up comic Barry Sobel to help him write his routine. Hanks ended up performing more than thirty times in clubs in Los Angeles and New York City.

Chairman of Columbia David Puttnam wanted to release Punchline during the Christmas of 1987, but the film wasn't ready. Puttnam eventually left, and Dawn Steel moved in and decided to release the film after Big (1988) became a huge hit. Punchline grossed $21.0 million in the United States.

Reception
The film received mixed reviews from critics. It has a rating of 60% on Rotten Tomatoes, based on 20 reviews. Variety wrote that "Hanks is the real reason to see the film and those who enjoyed watching him in Big will find a different, more realized comedian." Roger Ebert wrote that it "makes the fatal mistake of taking stand-up seriously. And if you’re gonna do that, you’d better have good material."  One review in The Washington Post read that it "commits the unforgivable sin – it's a movie about comedy that's not funny."  Another review in the same newspaper declared that "Seltzer has certainly redeemed his past (ever catch that Six Weeks thing between Dudley Moore and Mary Tyler Moore, or the Jon Voight Table for Five?). He should just avoid projects where you have to use the word 'bittersweet' – and grab at any others that star Tom Hanks."

The film opened on 4 screens in New York City, Los Angeles, Chicago and Toronto and grossed an impressive $160,742 during its opening weekend. It went on to gross $21 million in the United States and Canada.

See also
 Comedians (play)

References

External links

 
 
 

1988 films
1980s romantic comedy-drama films
American romantic comedy-drama films
Columbia Pictures films
1980s English-language films
Films about entertainers
Films directed by David Seltzer
Films set in New York City
Films about comedians
1988 comedy films
1988 drama films
1980s American films